The 2017 IHF Men's Youth World Championship was the seventh edition of the U-19 tournament and held in Tbilisi, Georgia from 8 to 20 August 2017. All matches were played in two halls at the Olympic Palace.

France won their second straight title by defeating Spain 28–25 in the final. Denmark captured the bronze medal after defeating Croatia 30–29.

Qualified teams

On 31 July 2017, Venezuela withdrew from the tournament and Poland was named as the substitute.

Draw
The draw was held on 10 May 2017.

Seedings
The seedings were announced on 8 May 2017.

Referees
The IHF selected 16 referee pairs for the championship.

Preliminary round
The schedule was announced on 29 May 2017.

All times are local (UTC+4).

Group A

Group B

Group C

Group D

President's Cup
17th place bracket

21st place bracket

21st–24th place semifinals

17th–20th place semifinals

23rd place game

21st place game

19th place game

17th place game

9–16th placement games
The eight losers of the round of 16 are seeded according to their results in the preliminary round against teams ranked 1–4 and play an elimination game to determine their final position.

15th place game

13th place game

Eleventh place game

Ninth place game

Knockout stage

Bracket

5th place bracket

Round of 16

Quarterfinals

5th–8th place semifinals

Semifinals

Seventh place game

Fifth place game

Third place game

Final

Final ranking

Statistics

Top goalscorers

Source: IHF

Top goalkeepers

Source: IHF

Awards

MVP
Left-back:  Kyllian Villeminot

All-star team
Goalkeeper:  Maksim Popov
Right wing:  Edouard Kempf
Right back:  Ivan Martinović
Centre back:  Ian Tarrafeta
Left back:  Emil Lærke
Left wing:  Emil Jakobsen
Pivot:  Luis Frade

References

External links
Official website

2017 Youth
Men's Youth World Handball Championship
2017 in Georgian sport
August 2017 sports events in Europe
Sports competitions in Tbilisi